Lochhman Garhi is a village in Dehradun district of Uttarakhand, India.  The Indian Military College was founded there in 1922.

Notes

Villages in Dehradun district